Panoplosaurini (derived from Panoplosaurus, "all shield reptile") is a clade of nodosaurid ankylosaurs from the Cretaceous of North America and South America. The group is defined as the largest clade containing Panoplosaurus mirus, but not Nodosaurus textilis or Struthiosaurus austriacus, and was named in 2021 by Madzia and colleagues for the group found in many previous analyses, both morphological and phylogenetic. Panoplosaurini includes not only the Late Cretaceous Panoplosaurus, Denversaurus and Edmontonia, but also the mid Cretaceous Animantarx and Texasetes, as well as Patagopelta. However, in the study describing it, its authors only placed it as a nodosaurine outside Panoplosaurini. The approximately equivalent clade Panoplosaurinae, named in 1929 by Franz Nopcsa, but was not significantly used until Robert Bakker reused the name in 1988, alongside the new clades Edmontoniinae and Edmontoniidae, which were considered to unite Panoplosaurus, Denversaurus and Edmontonia to the exclusion of other ankylosaurs. As none of the clades were commonly used, or formally named following the PhyloCode, Madzia et al. named Panoplosaurini instead, as the group of taxa fell within the clade Nodosaurinae, and having the same -inae suffix on both parent and child taxon could be confusing in future. The 2018 phylogenetic analysis of Rivera-Sylva and colleagues was used as the primary reference for Panoplosaurini by Madzia et al., in addition to the supplemental analyses of Arbour et al. (2016), Brown et al. (2017), and Zheng et al. (2018).

References

Nodosaurids
Cretaceous dinosaurs